This is a discography of Bollywood composer duo Laxmikant–Pyarelal, consisting of Laxmikant Shantaram Kudalkar and Pyarelal Ramprasad Sharma. They have composed music for over 635 films in their 35-year career.

Discography

See also 
 Laxmikant–Pyarelal

References 

Discographies of Indian artists